Kirsty Besterman (born 1980) is a British actress of the stage and screen. She trained at the Royal Academy of Dramatic Art graduating in 2002.

Filmography

Film

Television

Theatre
"Arcadia" (English Touring Theatre)
"Separate Tables" (Salisbury Playhouse)
"Tonight at 8.30" (English Touring Theatre)
"Private Lives" (Royal Lyceum Edinburgh)
"Playhouse Creatures" (Chichester Theatre) 
"Foxfinder" (Finborough Theatre)
"The Importance of Being Earnest" (The Rose Theatre Kingston)
"Amy's View" (Nottingham Playhouse) 
Plunder (Watermill Theatre)
The Rivals (Theatre Royal, Bath)
Othello (Cheek by Jowl), as Bianca.
King Lear (RSC Academy), as Cordelia.
Holding Fire! (Shakespeare's Globe).
The Merchant of Venice (Shakespeare's Globe), as Portia.
Macbeth (National Theatre tour), as Lady Macbeth.
She has also appeared in Peter Ackroyd's London and Doctors on BBC television, and Dragon Age: Inquisition when it comes to video games.

External links

References

British stage actresses
Living people
British film actresses
Alumni of RADA
21st-century British actresses
British Shakespearean actresses
British television actresses
1980 births